Anna Nicolaevna Podkopaeva (born 16 April 1990 in Ulyanovsk, née Malova) is a Russian volleyball player. She is a member of the Russia women's national volleyball team and was part of the national teams at the 2013 Summer Universiade in Kazan, the Montreux Volley Masters (in 2013, 2014), the FIVB Volleyball World Grand Prix (in 2013, 2014, 2015, 2016), the European Championships (in 2013, 2015), the 2014 FIVB Volleyball Women's World Championship in Italy, the 2015 FIVB Volleyball Women's World Cup in Japan, and the 2016 Summer Olympics in Rio de Janeiro.

At club level, she played for Iskra Samara and Ufimochka before joining Dinamo Moscow in January 2014.

Clubs
  Iskra Samara (2007–2009)
  Ufimochka (2009–2014)
  Dinamo Moscow (2014–2018)
  WVC Dynamo Kazan (2018–2022)
  Dinamo Moscow (2022–2023)

Awards

Individuals
 2015 FIVB World Grand Prix "Best Libero"
 2015 European Championship "Best Libero"

National team

Junior
 2013 Universiade –  Gold medal

Senior
 2013 Montreux Volley Masters –  Silver medal
 2013 Boris Yeltsin Cup –  Gold medal
 2013 European Championship –  Gold medal
 2014 Montreux Volley Masters –  Bronze medal
 2014 FIVB World Grand Prix –  Bronze medal
 2015 FIVB World Grand Prix –  Silver medal
 2015 European Championship –  Gold medal

Clubs
 2013 Russian Cup –  Gold medal (with Dinamo Moscow)
 2013–14 Russian Championship –  Silver medal (with Dinamo Moscow)
 2014–15 Russian Championship –  Silver medal (with Dinamo Moscow)
 2015–16 Russian Championship –  Gold medal (with Dinamo Moscow)
 2016 Russian Cup –  Silver medal (with Dinamo Moscow)
 2016–17 Russian Championship –  Gold medal (with Dinamo Moscow)

References

External links
 
  
 
 

1990 births
Living people
Russian women's volleyball players
Sportspeople from Ulyanovsk
Olympic volleyball players of Russia
Volleyball players at the 2016 Summer Olympics
Universiade medalists in volleyball
Universiade gold medalists for Russia
Medalists at the 2013 Summer Universiade
Volleyball players at the 2020 Summer Olympics
20th-century Russian women
21st-century Russian women